Benzonia is a village in Benzie County in the U.S. state of Michigan. The population was 497 at the 2010 census. The village is located within Benzonia Township at the southeast end of Crystal Lake on U.S. Highway 31 at the junction with M-115 west.

Geography

History

Benzonia began in 1858 as an educational Christian colony on the model of Oberlin, Ohio.  Its founding was under the leadership of Charles E. Bailey.  The village, which was once the county seat, was incorporated in 1891.

In 1863 Grand Traverse College was chartered and began here.  It was renamed Benzonia College in 1891.  In 1900 the college was changed to a preparatory school named Benzonia Academy.  The academy continued to function until 1918 when it was closed. In his book Waiting for the Morning Train, historian Bruce Catton captured local history and documented his perspective of growing up in Benzonia as his father was an instructor at the academy.

Demographics

2010 census
As of the census of 2010, there were 497 people, 209 households, and 125 families living in the village. The racial makeup of the village was 93.2% White, 1.2% African American, 0.4% Native American, 2.4% from other races, and 2.8% from two or more races. Hispanic or Latino of any race were 6.2% of the population.

There were 209 households, of which 28.7% had children under the age of 18 living with them, 35.9% were married couples living together, 19.1% had a female householder with no husband present, 4.8% had a male householder with no wife present, and 40.2% were non-families. 34.4% of all households were made up of individuals, and 11.5% had someone living alone who was 65 years of age or older. The average household size was 2.38 and the average family size was 3.04.

The median age in the village was 39.9 years. 25.6% of residents were under the age of 18; 8.3% were between the ages of 18 and 24; 21.2% were from 25 to 44; 26.1% were from 45 to 64; and 18.5% were 65 years of age or older. The gender makeup of the village was 45.1% male and 54.9% female.

2000 census
As of the census of 2000, there were 519 people, 211 households, and 128 families living in the village. The racial makeup of the village was 93.45% White, 0.39% African American, 3.08% Native American, 0.39% Asian, 0.19% Pacific Islander, 0.96% from other races, and 1.54% from two or more races. Hispanic or Latino of any race were 2.89% of the population.

There were 211 households, out of which 25.6% had children under the age of 18 living with them, 44.5% were married couples living together, 12.3% had a female householder with no husband present, and 39.3% were non-families. 33.2% of all households were made up of individuals, and 19.9% had someone living alone who was 65 years of age or older.  The average household size was 2.25 and the average family size was 2.88.

In the village, the population was spread out, with 21.0% under the age of 18, 10.4% from 18 to 24, 25.6% from 25 to 44, 22.4% from 45 to 64, and 20.6% who were 65 years of age or older.  The median age was 40 years. For every 100 females, there were 100.4 males.  For every 100 females age 18 and over, there were 106.0 males.

The median income for a household in the village was $28,650, and the median income for a family was $35,104. Males had a median income of $25,469 versus $20,313 for females. The per capita income for the village was $15,515.  About 5.0% of families and 10.1% of the population were below the poverty line, including 4.6% of those under age 18 and 15.6% of those age 65 or over.

Notable people 

 Bruce Catton, American Civil War historian; grew up in Benzonia
 Jennie W. Erickson, probation officer and school superintendent, went to school in Benzonia
Gwen Frostic, artist, author, Michigan Women's Hall of Fame inductee; moved to Benzonia April 26, 1964 to open up a shop selling books, stationery, prints and other items, until her death in 2001. The shop is still open.
Douglass North, economic historian and nobel laureate; had his summer home in Benzonia.
Dr. Dee Thornell, Dr. Dee, Alaska Vet, on Animal Planet Cable Channel;  Deanna, as she was known then, grew up in Benzonia and graduated as valedictorian of the class of 1976 at Benzie Central High School.

References

Villages in Benzie County, Michigan
Villages in Michigan
Traverse City micropolitan area
1858 establishments in Michigan
Populated places established in 1858